In mathematics, a delta operator is a shift-equivariant linear operator  on the vector space of polynomials in a variable  over a field  that reduces degrees by one.

To say that  is shift-equivariant means that if , then

To say that an operator reduces degree by one means that if  is a polynomial of degree , then  is either a polynomial of degree , or, in case ,  is 0.

Sometimes a delta operator is defined to be a shift-equivariant linear transformation on polynomials in  that maps  to a nonzero constant.  Seemingly weaker than the definition given above, this latter characterization can be shown to be equivalent to the stated definition when  has characteristic zero, since shift-equivariance is a fairly strong condition.

Examples

 The forward difference operator

 

is a delta operator.

 Differentiation with respect to x, written as D, is also a delta operator.
 Any operator of the form

It can be shown that all delta operators can be written in this form. For example, the difference operator given above can be expanded as

 The generalized derivative of time scale calculus which unifies the forward difference operator with the derivative of standard calculus is a delta operator.
 In computer science and cybernetics, the term "discrete-time delta operator" (δ) is generally taken to mean a difference operator

 

 the Euler approximation of the usual derivative with a discrete sample time . The delta-formulation obtains a significant number of numerical advantages compared to the shift-operator at fast sampling.

Basic polynomials

Every delta operator  has a unique sequence of "basic polynomials", a polynomial sequence defined by three conditions:

 
 
 

Such a sequence of basic polynomials is always of binomial type, and it can be shown that no other sequences of binomial type exist.  If the first two conditions above are dropped, then the third condition says this polynomial sequence is a Sheffer sequence—a more general concept.

See also 

 Pincherle derivative
 Shift operator
 Umbral calculus

References

External links 
 

Linear algebra
Polynomials
Finite differences